General elections were held in Belize on 21 November 1979. The result was a victory for the ruling People's United Party, which won 13 of the 18 seats. Voter turnout was 89.9%.

Background
The PUP went into the election with a 13–5 majority, having picked up a seat after the previous election when Toledo District Area Rep. Vicente Choco crossed the floor from the opposition United Democratic Party in 1975. The election results confirmed that 13-5 majority.

In 1979, Belizeans were concerned about their progress toward independence and the Guatemalan claim to the colony. The UDP were not in favour of advancing on the former issue without a substantial settlement of the latter, and this led the PUP to turn the election into a sort of referendum on that question. By their turnout (a record high) and their support for the PUP, Belizeans made clear their preferences and set in motion the chain of events that would lead to independence in 1981.

Results

References

Belize
General elections in Belize
1979 in Belize
Belize
Belize